John Waterloo Wilson may refer to:

John W. Wilson (1815–1883), Belgian art collector
John Wilson (sport shooter) (1879–1940), Olympic athlete and his grandson

See also
John Wilson (disambiguation)